The 69141/69142 Sanjan–Surat MEMU is a MEMU train of the Indian Railways connecting  and  of Gujarat. It is currently being operated with 69141/69142 train numbers on a daily basis.

Service

69141 Sanjan–Surat MEMU has average speed of 39 km/hr and covers 118 km in 3 hrs.
69142 Surat–Sanjan MEMU has average speed of 39 km/hr and covers 118 km in 3 hrs.

Route 

Coach composition

The train consists of 20 MEMU rake coaches.

External links 

 69141/Sanjan-Surat MEMU
 69142/Surat-Sanjan MEMU

References 

Transport in Surat
Electric multiple units in Gujarat
Valsad district